Two Evil Eyes (Italian: Due occhi diabolici) is a 1990 anthology horror film written and directed by George A. Romero and Dario Argento. An international co-production of Italy and the United States, Two Evil Eyes is split into two separate tales, both based largely on the works of Edgar Allan Poe: "The Facts in the Case of M. Valdemar", directed by Romero and starring Adrienne Barbeau; and "The Black Cat", directed by Argento and starring Harvey Keitel, which blends a number of Poe references into a new narrative. Both of the tales were filmed and take place in contemporary Pittsburgh.

Prior to Two Evil Eyes, Romero and Argento had worked together on Dawn of the Dead (1978).

Plot

"The Facts in the Case of Mr. Valdemar"
40-year-old Jessica Valdemar visits Steven Pike, her elderly husband's lawyer, with some paperwork for Mr. Pike's approval. Pike sees that Jessica's 65-year-old husband, Ernest Valdemar, who is dying from a terminal illness, is liquidating a number of his assets for cash and suspects Jessica of having undue influence on him. Pike talks to Ernest Valdemar over the phone, who confirms the decision. Pike reluctantly agrees to let Jessica have access to the money, but warns her that if anything were to happen to Valdemar within the next three weeks before the transfer of his estate over to Jessica is finalized, she will be investigated by the authorities.

Jessica returns home to Valdemar's mansion where she meets with Dr. Robert Hoffman. Hoffman and Jessica have been conspiring to cheat Ernest out of his estate by hypnotizing him and having him do what they wish from his deathbed. Robert wants to elope with Jessica after they acquire Ernest's $3 million assets. Later, Ernest dies while under hypnosis. Wanting to keep his death secret for the time being, Robert and Jessica hide his body in the basement freezer. During the night, Jessica hears moaning coming from the basement, but cannot wake up Robert, who has put himself under a hypnotic-induced slumber.

The next morning, Jessica and Robert hear the moaning from the basement. They open the freezer, and Valdemar's voice claims that his soul is alive and trapped in a dark void between the living and the dead. Valdemar tells them that he sees "others" looking at him. Jessica withdraws $300,000 from a bank and stores it in a safe, an action Robert sees. Valdemar's undead corpse tells Robert that the "others" are vengeful spirits that want to use him to enter our world. Valdemar tells Robert to wake him up from his hypnotic state. In a panic, Jessica shoots Valdemar's corpse and wants to bury the body and leave town with the money they have. While Robert heads outside to dig a hole to bury the body, Jessica goes back into the cellar only to find Valdemar's body walking towards her, saying that he is controlled by "the others". Robert returns inside and sees Jessica and Valdemar struggling on the balcony, where the undead walking cadaver shoots Jessica in the head and she falls off the balcony, dead.

Robert attempts to wake Valdemar from his hypnosis, but Valdemar tells Robert that it is too late, for without his body as a conduit, "the others" cannot return to their realm. "They're with you now!" exclaims Valdemar, who finally falls dead. Robert then steals all the cash that Jessica had stored in the safe and flees the house. Robert goes back to his apartment, where he puts himself under a hypnotic sleep. Shortly after, the ghostly "others" enter his apartment and kill him by shoving the hypnotic digital counter into his chest. The ghosts then form themselves into a mist and enter Robert's dead body.

Several days later, the police led by Detective Grogan arrive at Robert's apartment to answer complaints about a "strange smell" and constant moaning coming from the apartment. Grogan finds the apartment ransacked. The decomposed body of Robert, under the control of "the others", appears and attacks Grogan, while telling him that there is nobody to wake him up and that he is trapped forever.

"The Black Cat"
Crime scene photographer Rod Usher enters a building decorated with the abject remains of dismantled corpses. A naked woman lies bound to a table, sliced in two by a huge pendulum-like blade. Rod is frequently called upon the local authorities—led by Detective LeGrand—to document crime scenes in the area.

After arriving at his house, Rod works in his darkroom developing the photos when his work is interrupted by the appearance of a black cat, which has apparently been adopted by his live-in girlfriend Annabel. Annabel is a violinist who gives private lessons to local high school students who show up at the house after their school classes.

Over the next several days, an antipathy grows between Rod and the cat, a situation worsened by Annabel's excessive protection of it. Driven to distraction by the cat's apparent hatred of him, Rod eventually strangles it during a photo shoot he has set up, with the cat being the subject. Rod then uses the photos of him strangling the cat in his newest photography book, Metropolitan Horrors. As Annabel begins to realize what has happened to her pet, the couple argues violently, and Rod has a nightmare in which he is executed by medieval persons for murdering the cat.

One day, when Annabel finally spots his book in a shop window, with the strangled cat on the front cover, she immediately makes plans to leave Rod. Meanwhile, Rod is drinking heavily at a local bar. He becomes unnerved when the barmaid, Eleonora, gives him a stray black cat, identical to Annabel's cat. Rod notices that the feline has an identical white marking on its chest. Rod brings the cat home and sets about to kill it again, but Annabel rescues it, prompting Rod to kill her with a meat cleaver. When his suspicious next-door neighbor and landlord, Mr. Pym, arrives at his door, Rod assures him that nothing is wrong.

Rod conceals Annabel's behind a wall in the house and invents a story to explain Annabel's disappearance to her music students, Betty and Christian, when they show up the next day for their violin lessons. Christian, who doubts Rod's story, confides in Mr. and Mrs. Pym about his suspicions that Rod might have killed Annabel. When a friend of Annabel's in New York keeps phoning the house to ask about her whereabouts, Rod disconnected the phone. When the black cat appears from behind the wall, Rod kills it with a saw and disposes of it in a dumpster.

The next day, Detective LeGrand arrives with his partner to question Rod about Annabel's whereabouts. After looking around the house, the detectives leave, but return when an mewing sound is heard though one of the walls. Rod is handcuffed and the fake wall he put up is torn down, revealing that the cat had given birth in Annabel's tomb and its offspring are now feasting on the remains of their mistress. Rod grabs a pick-axe from LeGrand's partner and kills both policemen. Rod tries to make his escape when his neighbors arrive at the front door after hearing the commotion. Rod attempts to climb out a second floor window by using a rope tied around a tree in his backyard. However, he gets tangled in the rope and slips, the rope tightening around his neck, hanging him.

Cast

"The Facts in the Case of Mr. Valdemar"
 Adrienne Barbeau as Jessica Valdemar
 Ramy Zada as Dr. Robert Hoffman
 Bingo O'Malley as Ernest Valdemar
 Jeff Howell as Policeman
 E.G. Marshall as Steven Pike
 Chuck Aber as Mr. Pratt
 Tom Atkins as Detective Grogan
 Mitchell Baseman as Boy at Zoo
 Barbara Byrne as Martha
 Larry John Meyers as Old Man
 Christina Romero as Mother at Zoo
 Anthony Dileo Jr. as Taxi Driver
 Christine Forrest as Nurse

"The Black Cat"
 Cinzentinha as The Cat
 Harvey Keitel as Rod Usher
 Madeleine Potter as Annabel
 John Amos as Detective LeGrand
 Sally Kirkland as Eleonora
 Kim Hunter as Mrs. Pym
 Holter Graham as Christian
 Martin Balsam as Mr. Pym
 Jonathan Adams as Hammer
 Julie Benz as Betty
 Lanene Charters as Bonnie
 Bill Dalzell III as Detective
 J. R. Hall as 2nd Policeman
 Scott House as 3rd Policeman
 James G. MacDonald as Luke
 Peggy Sanders as Young Policewoman
 Lou Valenzi as Editor
 Jeffrey Wild as Delivery Man
 Ted Worsley as Desk Editor
 Tom Savini as the Monomaniac (uncredited)

Production
Two Evil Eyes was originally intended to be an anthology film consisting of four segments based on Edgar Allan Poe stories, each by a different director. John Carpenter and Stephen King were considered to direct two of the segments, but Carpenter had scheduling issues, and King was uninterested in serving as a director again after his experience directing the 1986 film Maximum Overdrive.

Romero collaborator Tom Savini provided the special make-up and gore effects for Two Evil Eyes. Savini also appears briefly in "The Black Cat" episode as "the Monomaniac", a killer who rips out his victim's teeth.

Two Evil Eyes was Julie Benz's first acting role and the first feature film she starred in. Benz appears as a teenage violin student in a few scenes in "The Black Cat" episode. Benz's voice was dubbed in the Italian-language version of the film by Dario Argento's daughter, Asia.

Reception
Two Evil Eyes holds a rating of 53% on Rotten Tomatoes based on 17 reviews, with an average rating of 5.4/10.

In the book Art of Darkness: The Cinema of Dario Argento, a reviewer wrote of the film that, "Romero was a bizarre choice of director for an adaptation of Poe," and that Romero's segment lacked "any of the director's own trademarks: his striking use of space and editing, the moments of bleak surrealism and dark irony." Though he commended Tom Savini's effects work, Gallant concluded that "the twin halves of Two Evil Eyes make utterly inappropriate bedfellows, coming from two directors whose styles, even at their best, would make an incongruous combination."

References

Bibliography

External links
 
 

1990 films
1990 horror films
1990 fantasy films
American horror anthology films
Films directed by Dario Argento
Films directed by George A. Romero
Films based on multiple works
Films set in Pittsburgh
Films shot in Pittsburgh
Italian supernatural horror films
American supernatural horror films
Italian anthology films
Italian serial killer films
Films based on The Black Cat
Films based on works by Edgar Allan Poe
Films about cats
Films scored by Pino Donaggio
Films with screenplays by Dario Argento
Films about animals
Italian zombie films
American zombie films
1990s English-language films
1990s American films